Penicillus is a genus of algae in the family Udoteaceae. Corallocephalus is a known synonym.

References

External links

Bryopsidales genera
Udoteaceae